Oflag XXI-B and Stalag XXI-B were World War II German prisoner-of-war camps for officers and enlisted men, located at Szubin a few miles southwest of Bydgoszcz, Poland, which at that time was occupied by Nazi Germany.

Timeline

 September 1939 – The Germans established a camp for arrested Polish civilians, mostly the intelligentsia, arrested as part of the Intelligenzaktion.
 October 1939 – First Polish soldiers captured during the German Invasion of Poland (1939) brought to Szubin, Kriegsgefangenenlager Schubin prisoner-of-war camp for Poles established. The camp was built around a Polish boys' school by adding barracks. Polish POWs were used for the expansion of the camp.
 December 1939 - The Germans formally established the Stalag XXI-B2 POW camp in Szubin, and the Stalag XXI-B1 POW camp in Antoniewo near Skoki, both for Polish POWs.
 March-May 1940 - Polish POWs were transferred to other camps, located in Germany.
 June 1940 - French officers were brought here from the Battle of France.
 August 1940 - Stalag XXI-B2 was renamed to Stalag XXI-B; Stalag XXI-B1 in Antoniewo was renamed to Stalag XXI-B/Z, and made a branch camp of the Stalag XXI-B in Szubin.
 September 1940 - Oflag XXI-B for Allied officers established. Its first prisoners were the French. Stalag XXI-B and Oflag XXI-B co-existed next to each other for three months.
 December 1940 – Stalag XXI-B was relocated to the nearby village of Tur. Polish officers, previously held together with enlisted men in other camps, were moved to Oflag XXI-B.
 1941/1942 – All French officers had been transferred elsewhere prior to the arrival of British officer POWs.
 September 1942 – British and Commonwealth officers of the Royal Air Force and Fleet Air Arm were transferred from Oflag VI-B at Warburg following its temporary closure. These included airmen from Poland, Czechoslovakia and other occupied countries serving in the RAF, as well as airmen from the Allied Air Forces - RAAF, RNZAF, RCAF, SAAF, USAAF.
 October 1942 – More British RAF Officers and NCOs arrive from Stalag Luft III to help relieve overcrowding there.
 November 1942 – A second batch of British RAF officers arrive from Stalag Luft III
 October to March 1943 - Newly captured British, American and Allied Air Force officers arrive in batches transferred from Dulag luft.
 March 1943 – A mass escape through a tunnel occurs - 35 men escape, albeit none are successful in reaching neutral territory.
 April 1943 – The camp is cleared of all POWs - all being sent to the enlarged Stalag Luft III.
 The camp was later re-opened and re-numbered Oflag 64 for American officers only.

Notable prisoners
 William Ash – American serving in RCAF, escapee and future author
 Anthony Barber – RAF pilot and future Chancellor of the Exchequer
 Per Bergsland – Norwegian pilot serving in RAF and Great Escape
 Josef Bryks – Czechoslovak RAFVR fighter pilot and serial escaper (1942 – March 1943).
 Jimmy Buckley RN – Fleet Air Arm Pilot and escapee
 Flight Lieutenant CC Cheshire – RAF Pilot and brother of Leonard Cheshire VC
 Aidan Crawley – RAF Officer and future author, journalist and MP
 Wing Commander Harry Day, Great Escape survivor, who was Senior British Officer November 1942 – March 1943
 Johnnie Dodge – British Army officer and Great Escape survivor
 Flight Lieutenant Bertram James – RAF Pilot and Great Escape survivor
 Robert Kee – RAF Pilot and future author and journalist
 Oliver Philpot – RAF Pilot and escapee
 Peter Stevens – RAF pilot of German-Jewish birth and serial escapee
 Jorgen Thalbitzer – Danish pilot serving in RAF
 Eric Williams – RAF Officer and escapee
 Albert W Harris - Private. The Buffs Royal East Kent Regiment.

References

Sources

See also
List of German WWII POW camps
Oflag
Oflag 64
Stalag Luft III

Oflags
World War II sites in Poland